The Electravia Electro Trike is a French electric ultralight trike, produced by Electravia of Alpes de Haute Provence. The aircraft is supplied as a complete ready-to-fly-aircraft.

The Electro Trike prototype was introduced at the first Green Aviation Airshow at Le Bourget in June 2008.

Design and development
The Electro Trike was designed to comply with the Fédération Aéronautique Internationale microlight category and the US FAR 103 Ultralight Vehicles rules. It was first developed by taking the existing DTA Alizés carriage and its Ellipse Fuji wing and replacing the internal combustion engine with an electric motor.

The aircraft features a cable-braced hang glider-style high wing, weight-shift controls, a single-seat open cockpit, tricycle landing gear and a single engine in pusher configuration.

The aircraft is made from bolted-together aluminum tubing, with its single surface wing covered in Dacron sailcloth. Its  span wing is supported by a single tube-type kingpost and uses an "A" frame weight-shift control bar. The powerplant is an Electravia GMPE 102 electric motor, producing .

The single battery pack gives a flight endurance of one hour, while the addition of a second battery pack allows flights of 1 1/2 hours.

Specifications (Electro Trike)

See also
Electravia Monotrace-E

References

External links

2000s French sport aircraft
2000s French ultralight aircraft
Single-engined pusher aircraft
Electric aircraft
Ultralight trikes
Aircraft first flown in 2008
Electro Trike